Rabieb Sangnual (born 11 May 1950) is a Thai boxer. He competed in the men's welterweight event at the 1972 Summer Olympics.

References

1950 births
Living people
Rabieb Sangnual
Rabieb Sangnual
Boxers at the 1972 Summer Olympics
Place of birth missing (living people)
Asian Games medalists in boxing
Boxers at the 1978 Asian Games
Rabieb Sangnual
Medalists at the 1978 Asian Games
Southeast Asian Games medalists in boxing
Welterweight boxers